Stefan Drzewiecki (26 July 1844, Kunka, Podolia, Russian Empire (today Ukraine) – 23 April 1938, Paris) was a Polish scientist,  journalist, engineer, constructor and inventor, known for designing and constructing the world’s first submarine, he was working in France and the Russian Empire. He built the first submarine in the world with electric battery-powered propulsion (1884).

Life
Drzewiecki was born into Polish aristocratic (szlachta) family of national patriots. His grandfather Józef Drzewiecki served under generals Kościuszko and Dąbrowski. His father Karol Drzewiecki took part in the November Uprising against Russia. Young Stefan was sent by him away from partitioned Poland to complete his education in France. At the beginning of 1860. Drzewiecki was admitted to L'Ecole Centrale des Arts et Manufactures, however he postponed finishing his engineering studies to take part in January Uprising (1863-1864) against Russia. A few years later, he came back to Paris to finish his study. With a knack for creativity and invention, Stefan Drzewiecki invented such useful tools as the kilometric counter for taxicabs. At the special request of Grand Duke Konstantin, Drzewiecki moved to Saint Petersburg in 1873 at the age of 29. While in Russia Drzewiecki had a fruitful career as a mechanical engineer.

Career

Drzewiecki distinguished himself mainly in aviation and ship building. Beginning in 1877, during the Russo-Turkish War, he developed several models of propeller-driven submarines that evolved from single-person vessels to a four-man model.

In 1884, he converted 2 mechanical submarines, installed on each a 1 hp engine with the new, at the time, source of energy - batteries. On tests submarine went under the water against the flow of the Neva River, Russia at a rate of 4 knots. It was the first submarine in the world with electric battery-powered propulsion.

He developed the theory of gliding flight, developed a method for the manufacture of ship and plane propellers (1892), and presented a general theory for screw-propeller thrust (1920). He also developed several models of early submarines for the Russian Navy, and devised a torpedo-launching system for ships and submarines that bears his name, the Drzewiecki drop collar.
He also made an instrument that drew the precise routes of ships onto a nautical chart.

His work Theorie générale de l'hélice (1920), was honored by the French Academy of Science as fundamental in the development of modern propellers.

See also

Blade element theory designed by William Froude (1878), David W. Taylor (1893) and Stefan Drzewiecki to determine the behavior of propellers.

Notes

References
 Słownik polskich pionierów techniki pod redakcją Bolesława Orłowskiego. Katowice: Wydawnictwo „Śląsk”, 1986, s. 57. .
 Alfred Liebfeld, Polacy na szlakach techniki. Warszawa: Wydawnictwa Szkolne i Pedagogiczne, 1985, s. 215–225. .
 Krzysztof Kubiak, Wielki błękit wynalazców, biuletyn „Rzeczpospolitej” 11 grudnia 2010, Nr 47
 Jerzy Pertek, Polscy pionierzy podwodnej żeglugi, seria wydawnicza Wydawnictwa Morskiego Miniatury Morskie zeszyt 3: Polskie tradycje morskie, s. 26–49.

1844 births
1938 deaths
Polish inventors
Polish engineers
Recipients of the Cross of St. George
Submarine pioneers
Marine engineers
People from Vinnytsia Oblast